Allothrombium polikarpi is a species of mite belonging to the family Trombidiidae, first described from Greece.

References

Further reading
 Haitlinger, R. "New records of mites (Acari: Prostigmata: Erythraeidae, Eutrombidiiddae, Microtrombidiidae, Podothrombiidae, Trombidiidae) from Bulgaria, Macedonia and Romania." Zeszyty Naukowe Uniwersytetu Przyrodniczego we Wrocławiu-Biologia i Hodowla Zwierzat 58.572 (2009): 49-60.
 Wohltmann, Andreas, and Joanna Makol. "A redescription of Allothrombium meridionale Berlese, 1910 (Acari: Trombidiformes: Trombidioidea) with notes on biology and developmental malformations." Annales Zoologici. Vol. 59. No. 3. Museum and Institute of Zoology, Polish Academy of Sciences, 2009.

Trombidiformes
Arachnids of Europe
Animals described in 2006